Ole Olsen (4 July 1850 – 4 November 1927) was a Norwegian organist, composer, conductor and military musician.

Life
Olsen was born in Hammerfest, in the county of Finnmark. His mother died when he was young. His father was Iver Olsen, a craftsman and an amateur musician who played the organ at the local church.  From a young age Olsen learnt to play the piano and the violin. At the age of five he composed his first small piece, and by the age of seven he sometimes stood in for his father playing the church pipe organ.

In 1865 Olsen went to Trondheim as apprentice to a craftsman. He also studied composition and the organ from Fredrick and Just Lindeman, and sometimes substituted for Just as the organist in the Trondheim cathedral. In 1870, having given up his apprenticeship, he moved to Leipzig where he studied under Oscar Paul at the music conservatory until 1874.  There he wrote his Symphony in G major, and began his opera Stig Hvide.

In 1874 he became a teacher in Christiania (now Oslo), where he spent most of the rest of his life.  He conducted the Christiania Artisans' Choral Society from 1876–1880, the Music Society orchestra from 1877–1880, and the freemason's orchestra from 1894–1908.  From 1884 he was the music director of the Akershus 2nd Brigade.  From 1899–1920 he was a music inspector.

He had married Marie Hals, the daughter of piano manufacturer Karl Hals, in 1879. He died in Oslo on November 4, 1927. His interment was at Cemetery of Our Saviour.

Music

Olsen's operas were influenced by Richard Wagner. Another strong influence was the traditional Joik form of song, as he was involved in collecting folk tunes while in the military. These influenced the large number of military marches he composed, and the nationalist tradition was also represented in his stage works.

His compositions include:

 operas
 Stig Hvide (1872–76)
 Lajla (1893)
 Stallo (1902)
 Klippeøerne (1904–10)
 oratorio
 Nidaros (1897)
 cantatas
 Ludvig Holberg (1884)
 Griffenfeldt (1897)
 Broderbud (n.d.)
 male chorus
 Fanevakt (n.d.)
 I jotunheimen (n.d.)
 symphonic poems
 Asgårdsreien (1878)
 Alfedans
 orchestral
 Symphony in G major
 Petite Suite for piano and strings (1902)
 Trombone Concerto (1905)
 Væringetog
 Ritornell
 Romance
Tarantelle
 others
 Svein Uræd (1890)
 King Erik XIV (1882)
 piano pieces
 military marches

Recordings
(rel. 1991) Ole Olsen: Little Suite for piano & string orchestra; Piano works by 7 women composers —  (piano), Norwegian Radio Orchestra, Christian Eggen (cond.) — Norsk Kulturråds Klassikerserie NKFCD 50024-2
(rel. 2003) A Norwegian Rendezvous, Vol. 2: Music from the Romantic Period [includes Olsen's Suite for strings, Op.60; Miniature Suite, Op.68; Two anglaises; Vals lento] — Kristiansand Chamber Orchestra, Jan Stigmer (leader) — Intim Musik 81
(rec. 2009) Ole Olsen: Asgaardsreien, Op.10; Symphony in G major, Op.5; Suite for string orchestra, Op.60 — Latvian National Symphony Orchestra, Terje Mikkelsen (cond.) — Sterling CDS 1086-2
(rel. 2007) Shadow Songs [includes Olsen's Humoreske (No.2 of 3 Lieder); Paa Fjeldet, Op.7 No.1; Irmelin Rose, Op.56] — Harald Bjørkøy (tenor), ? (piano) —  EUCD 040
(rec. 2011) Ole Olsen: Symphony No.1, Op.5; Trombone Concerto, Op.48(46); Asgaardsreien, Op.10 — Christian Lindberg (trombone & cond.), Arctic Philharmonic Orchestra, Rune Halvorsen (cond.) — BIS BIS-1968 SACD
(rel. 2013) Ole Olsen: Rav [23 Songs: complete Opp.7, 24, 56, 60, 65; 3 songs from Op.68; 3 Lieder; Forvarssang; Karinssang; Sov, sov barnelil] —   (mezzo-soprano),  (tenor);  (piano) —  EUCD 084

Recordings on YouTube
From CDs listed above
From the BIS CD: Asgaardsreien, Op.10
From the Intim CD (Complete CD playlist):
Suite from Svein Uræd, Op.60: 1. Sang; 2. Nordlys og isfjell; 3. Vaar; 4. Drøm; 5. Amongst Gypsies; 6. Dverger og alfer; 7. Solefallssang
Miniature Suite, Op.68: 1. Baatfart; 2. Serenade; 3. Sagn; 4. Intermezzo; 5. Landsbyspillemann
Two anglaises
Vals lento
From the Euridice Shadow Songs CD: Humoreske (No.2 of 3 Lieder); Paa Fjeldet, Op.7 No.1; Irmelin Rose, Op.56 (Harald Bjørkøy)
From the Euridice Rav CD: Complete CD playlist
From different CDs
Serenade, Op.19 No.2 (Militært 80 Manns Janitsjarkorps)
Serenade, Op.19 No.2 (The Band Of His Majesty The King'S Guard - Norway, conducted by Kjell Martinsen)
Sørgemarsch, Op.41 (The Band Of His Majesty The King'S Guard - Norway, conducted by Kjell Martinsen)
Sørgemarsch, Op.41 (The Staff Band of the Norwegian Armed Forces, conducted by Ole Kristian Ruud)
Overture to Svein Uræd, Op.60 (The Staff Band of the Norwegian Armed Forces, conducted by Ole Kristian Ruud)
Solefallssang from Svein Uræd, Op.60 (Njål Sparbo)
Garmo-marsjen (Forsvarets Stabsmusikkorps)
Numedals Bataljonsmarsj (The Band Of His Majesty The King'S Guard - Norway, conducted by Kjell Martinsen)
Regimentmarsch (Oslo Brigade Orchestra, conducted by Jan Eriksen)
Unknown
Petite suite, Op.50 for piano and strings (Johan Eian, Norwegian Radio Orchestra, conducted by Sverre Bruland)
Live performances
Klippeøerne (concert performance, with piano accompaniment, 2020)
Asgaardsreien, Op.10 (The Arctic Philharmonic, conducted by Christian Lindberg)
Piano works performed by Phillip Sear:
From the Petite suite, Op.50: 1. Fanitul; 2. Mazurka; 3. Serenade; 4. Humoreske
Valse-Caprice, Op.52

References

 Grinde, Nils. 1991. Ole Olsen - Biography Music Information Centre Norway, 1991 (accessed 28 August 2005)
 The New Grove Dictionary of Music and Musicians, edited by Stanley Sadie. London: Macmillan (2001). vol. 18, p. 40.

External links 
 
 

1850 births
1927 deaths
Burials at the Cemetery of Our Saviour
Norwegian Army personnel
Norwegian classical composers
Norwegian classical organists
Male classical organists
Norwegian conductors (music)
Male conductors (music)
Musicians from Hammerfest
Norwegian male classical composers
Norwegian military musicians
People from Hammerfest